Brandy Hill is a hill in South Wales between Pendine and Whitland, and south-west of St. Clears. At the summit stand a radio transmitter and a trig point.

References

Marilyns of Wales
Mountains and hills of Carmarthenshire